In the field of molecular biology, the Mi-2/NuRD (Nucleosome Remodeling Deacetylase) complex, is a group of associated proteins with both ATP-dependent chromatin remodeling and histone deacetylase activities.  , Mi-2/NuRD was the only known protein complex that couples chromatin remodeling ATPase and chromatin deacetylation enzymatic functions.

The NuRD complex contains seven subunits: the histone deacetylase core proteins HDAC1 and HDAC2, the histone-binding proteins RbAp46 and RbAp48, the metastasis-associated proteins MTA1 (or MTA2 / MTA3), the methyl-CpG-binding domain protein MBD3 (or MBD2) and the chromodomain-helicase-DNA-binding protein CHD3 (aka Mi-2alpha) or CHD4 (aka Mi-2beta).

The histone deacetylases HDAC1 and HDAC2 and the histone binding proteins RbAp48 and RbAp46 form a core complex shared between NuRD and Sin3-histone deacetylase complexes.

Overexpression of Mbd3, a subunit of NuRD, inhibits induction of iPSCs. Depletion of Mbd3, on the other hand, improves reprogramming efficiency only in fibroblast, that results in deterministic and synchronized iPS cell reprogramming (near 100% efficiency within seven days from mouse and human cells).

References 

Protein complexes